KBC Bank Ireland plc is a bank in Ireland with offices in Dublin, Cork, Limerick, Galway, Waterford and Belfast.

It was established in 1972 as Irish Intercontinental Bank. In 1978 KBC Bank, which is headquartered in Brussels, acquired a 75% interest. KBC Bank acquired a full 100% shareholding in IIB in 1999, and in 2000 the bank's name changed to IIB Bank. On 27 October 2008, the 30th anniversary of KBC's majority ownership, the bank was renamed KBC Bank Ireland plc.

KBC Bank Ireland provides a wide range of banking services including Corporate, Commercial and Business Banking, Private Banking and Treasury & Capital Markets. Its mortgage division, KBC Homeloans, is a leading mortgage provider in Ireland.

KBC began operating a branch network in 2012 with a further build-out in 2014. This follows the exit of Halifax Ireland and Danske Bank from the Irish retail market, with some branches being located in former locations of those banks.

KBC initiated a high-profile property repossession in Strokestown, in County Roscommon in December 2018.  Following this, there was a violent attack by a gang of masked men on the team employed by KBC to occupy the house.

In April 2021, KBC entered into talks with Bank of Ireland to sell its performing loan book and announced its intention to withdraw from Ireland.

KBC in Ireland 
KBC has 1000+ employees in Ireland in the following companies:

KBC Bank Ireland plc 
KBC Fund Management

References

External links

Annual Reports KBC Ireland
KBC Homeloans
KBC Ireland
KBC Bank & Insurance Group (Archived)

Irish companies established in 1973
Banks of Ireland
Financial services in the Republic of Ireland
Banks of Northern Ireland
Banks established in 1973
Irish subsidiaries of foreign companies